also know as  is a fictional character in the anime and manga series One Piece created by Eiichiro Oda. He is the Chief of the "Red Haired Pirates" and also one of the "Four Emperors" which is known to be the strongest pirates that rule over the New World. He is a former member of the legendary pirate crew, Roger Pirates, the only pirate crew which successfully conquered the Grand Line.
 
Shanks is notably known as the pirate who inspired Monkey D. Luffy to go on his own pirate journey and become the new Pirate King. He owned Luffy's signature straw hat, which was originally possessed by Pirate King Gol D. Roger and he gifted it to Luffy as part of a promise for them to meet again someday.

Shanks appears in several of the franchise's video games and merchandises. He had been one of the popular characters in One Piece appearing always in popularity polls and marketing despite rarely appearing in the series manga and anime.

Creation and conception
Author Eiichiro Oda had first featured Shanks in the first pilot of One Piece series, Romance Dawn: Version 1, which also known as One Piece Chapter 0 in the Shonen Jump specials showcasing upcoming artists including Oda about a year and a half before One Piece series began. Much of his storyline remained the same from One Piece series except that Higuma the Bandit was absent from the story in this version. Another difference was that Shanks arm was bitten off by a shark instead of a Sea King. Also, in this version, Shanks himself is described as a "Peace" main type of pirate.
 But in the second pilot Romance Dawn: Version 2, Luffy got both his hat and the Devil Fruit he ate from his grandfather, and not Shanks. According to Oda, the reason for not featuring Shanks was that he wanted Shanks to be kept a secret until One Piece was serialized so he would have a greater impact in the manga.

In the main series, Shanks is described as a tall man, well-built, tan-complexioned, and in the prime of his mid-adulthood.
True to his epithet, Shanks has distinctly red hair which usually depicted across the media as deep-crimsonish. In his later appearance of the series, he is shown with slightly longer hair, wavier and more slicked back than before except for some few strands he lets fall down the sides of his face, pushed farther sideward than said prior bangs. Oda basically draws manga without applying screen tones when expressing the colors of clothes and hair, but with Shanks, Oda exceptionally drew his hair color with screen tones.

On his face resides a secondary trademark: a triple set of parallel, linear scars that pass vertically, at an angle over his left (untouched) eye, revealed to have been given to him by Blackbeard some unknown time before the start of the series. Additionally, Shanks' left arm is missing from below the deltoid, as a result of him saving Luffy from a Sea King. Oda had chosen Gryphon, a sabre, as Shanks only weapon in the entire series.

According to Oda, Shanks is the one character that resembles himself the most out of all the One Piece characters, because of his cool and calm personality and stand-out attire.

Casting

In the Japanese version of One Piece's anime adaptations by Toei Animation, Shanks has been voiced by Shūichi Ikeda. In the Funimation English adaptation, his voice actor is Brandon Potter. As for the 4Kids English adaptation, he is voiced by Tom Souhrada who gave him a Cockney accent.

Additionally, in the upcoming One Piece Live Action Series adapted by Netflix, Shanks will be portrayed by Peter Gadiot. Gadiot’s casting was announced in a video on the Netflix series' official Twitter account. In the short video, the Hollywood star personally announces that he will be playing Shanks, before confirming that he is in Cape Town currently working on the production.

Abilities
Later in the series, it revealed that Shanks was a former member and apprentice of the Roger Pirates which is the only known crew to ever reach last island of Grand Line known as Laugh Tale. Currently, Shanks is chief of the Red Hair Pirates, which are recognized as one of the four strongest pirate crews. They are the most balanced and impregnable as a group, showing little weakness overall and well recognized as having a high average bounty. Additionally, Shanks is one of the Four Emperors in the New World and the youngest among them. It had shown in the series that despite his age, Shanks is on an equal level with the more experienced Kaido, Charlotte Linlin, and even Whitebeard, who was feared as the strongest pirate in the World. In 1001th chapter of the manga, it shown that Kaidou acknowledges Shanks as one of the very few powerful pirates capable of fighting him.

Haki
According to One Piece Vivre Card, Shanks is one of the very small number of people in the One Piece world who can use all three types of Haki (覇気, ambition). Even Whitebeard complimented Shanks for his Haki when he used it on his visit, with Jozu stating it was overwhelming. Shanks can use Conqueror's Haki Haki (覇王色の覇気, Haōshoku no Haki), making him one in several million people. While Shanks was boarding Whitebeard's ship for their meeting, dozens of Whitebeard's men collapsed into unconsciousness as the ship itself began taking physical damage from Shanks' mere presence, impressing those around him. In One Piece SBS, Oda revealed that Shanks' Conqueror's Haki was at least twice as potent as Luffy's by the time of the Fish-Man Island Arc; Shanks could have knocked out all 100,000 of New Fish-Man Pirates opposing the Straw Hats, whereas Luffy did overwhelm only half that. Additionally in the series, it revealed that Shanks also has a great mastery over Armament Haki (武装色の覇気, Busōshoku no Haki). During the Summit War of Marineford, his Haki-infused sword easily blocked Akainu's magma-enhanced punch which was powerful enough to burn stronger enemies such as Ace, Jinbe, and even the Emperor Whitebeard.
He also a He is proficient in Observation Haki (見聞色の覇気, Kenbunshoku no Haki), a sixth sense, which can read a person's moves and detect their presence.

Appearances

One Piece manga

Backstory
Shanks grew up on the crew of the Roger Pirates alongside Buggy the Clown. Shanks was close to both Captain Gol D. Roger, who gave him his straw hat, and First Mate Silvers Rayleigh. Shanks and Buggy were one of the first on the crew to warm to Kozuki Oden when he joined the Roger Pirates. Oden was unsure if Buggy and Shanks were “best friends or mortal enemies.” The two would frequently argue over trivial matters such as if the North Pole was colder than the South Pole. Buggy would later claim a grudge against Shanks and blamed him for ruining a pilot to steal a Devil Fruit and leave the crew. Shanks actually saved Buggy’s life from drowning. When Buggy became too sick with a fever to go to the final island, Laugh Tale, where the One Piece is supposedly located, Shanks stayed behind with Buggy, saying “we’ll take our own ship one day." While Roger and the crew laughed when they found the One Piece, when Roger informed Shanks about it, Shanks cried. Dying of a terminal illness, Roger would disband the crew and turned himself into the World Government. Shanks and Buggy were present at Roger’s execution, where Shanks would invite Buggy to join his crew, only to be rebuffed. The two would not see each other again for over two decades.

East Blue Saga
One day, Shanks and his crew were parting in the Partys Bar, with Shanks denying Luffy the opportunity to join his crew because he felt the boy was too young and inexperienced. They were interrupted when Higuma and his bandits arrived and demanded sake. Shanks offered Higuma the last bottle, but Higuma smashed it over his head because he felt it was not enough. Higuma threw Shanks' food onto him and left, convinced that Shanks was a coward. Luffy was angry by how Shanks refused to fight back and later discovered that he had eaten the Gomu Gomu no Mi. A few days later, Higuma returned and took Luffy as a hostage when the latter insulted him. As Higuma was preparing to kill Luffy, Shanks have returned. Soon afterward, Shanks caught up to Luffy, who had been thrown into the ocean by Higuma, and defended him from the Lord of the Coast, whom he scared away with a glare. Luffy began crying over how Shanks had lost his left arm in defending him, only for Shanks to claim it was just an arm. Later, Shanks and his crew began preparing to leave the village. When Luffy told him that he would become a pirate on his own, Shanks claimed that Luffy did not have what it took to become a pirate, which prompted Luffy to angrily proclaim that he would gather his own crew to rival Shanks' and claim One Piece himself. Smiling at this, Shanks gave Luffy his Straw hat and told him to “promise that you’ll give it back to me someday when you’ve become a great pirate.”

Sometime later, while Shanks and his crew were relaxing on an island after drinking too much, his old rival Mihawk arrived. Shanks initially believed Mihawk was there to duel, but Mihawk retorted he had no interest in fighting a one-armed swordsman. Mihawk showed Shanks Luffy’s new bounty of 30,000,000 Beli. Seeing Luffy had finally made his emergence, a gleeful Shanks had Mihawk stay as he threw another party despite his hangover from his previous drinking session.

Whitebeard and Ace
Shanks met Whitebeard and used Supreme King Haki to render the lower-ranking members of Whitebeard's crew unconscious. After sitting down to drink with Shanks, Whitebeard began reminiscing about the past, where he noted that Shanks “made quite a leap” in status as he used to be a simple apprentice on Roger's ship. Whitebeard claimed that he could still hear the duels between Shanks and Mihawk that used to echo throughout the Grand Line before asking him what enemy he lost his left arm to, only for Shanks to state that he “gave it up for the sake of a new era. Shanks insisted Whitebeard call off Ace from seeking retribution towards Blackbeard after he murdered a fellow crew member. Whitebeard angrily rejected Shanks demand. After finishing their sake, Shanks and Whitebeard drew their weapons and clashed, resulting in the skies above them splitting in two. Garp had revealed to Luffy that Shanks was one of the strongest pirates in the world alongside Whitebeard and they were called "Four Emperors" which rule over the New World.

Shanks’ failure to stop Ace’s mission of retribution towards Blackbeard results in Blackbeard’s capture of Ace, his promotion to the Seven Warlords of the Sea, and the execution of Portgas D. Ace, which triggers a war between the Whitebeard Pirates and their allies versus the Marines and the Seven Warlords. At the execution, Ace is revealed to be Gol D. Roger’s biological son. Ace and Whitebeard die in the ensuing war to Admiral Akainu and the Blackbeard Pirates, respectively. 

After the deaths of Ace and Whitebeard, Shanks suddenly arrives at Marineford, just in time to save Koby from being killed by Admiral Akainu. Garp was so angry seeing Shanks and said that he was the one who lead Luffy into the path of pirate. Shanks ordered Buggy to ensure Luffy got his Straw Hat, lying to him that he would give Buggy a treasure map for doing so. Lucky Roux asked Shanks if he wanted to see Luffy, who was passed out, but Shanks responded that to do so would “violate our agreement” to see each other again once Luffy became “a great pirate.” When Buggy chewed Shanks out for lying to him about a treasure chest, Shanks casually replied that it had “been a long time.”

Shanks then told the remaining Marine and Whitebeard Pirates that he and his crew would fight anyone who wished to continue the war. Shanks asked Blackbeard if he wished to do so, but Blackbeard decided to leave instead, having determined that it is not yet time to face Shanks. Shanks told the remaining Whitebeard Pirates and Marines to save face for him before telling the Marines that he wanted to give Whitebeard and Ace the burials they deserved. When Fleet Admiral Sengoku stated he would hand their corpses over to the pirates and that he would take responsibility for the Marines' actions, Shanks thanked him for doing so.
Later in the New World, the Red Hair Pirates attended Whitebeard and Ace's funeral with the Whitebeard Pirates to pay their respects.

Four Emperors Saga
As the news of Luffy's exploits at Totto Land spread across the world, Shanks read the newspaper and looked forward to seeing Luffy again “soon." Shanks later went to Mary Geoise during the Reverie summit of 50 monarchs to speak with the Five Elders in person about “a certain pirate.”
In Wano Arc, it finally revealed that Shanks current bounty is ฿ 4,048,9,000.

In other media 
Shanks is a popular subject of One Piece merchandise and in other media material as well. Some of these merchandises includes a limited edition Woodblock which cost 17,500 Yen, Imperial Enterprise Digital Watch and Official Wristwatch, Pepsi Nex Zero figures, Medicom Toys Be@rbrick Figures, Bandai Figuarts Zero, and etc. Eiichiro Oda drew and wrote a short story starring Shanks which titled as  "Red Hair of Class 3-Sea Time". This was written after Shanks won a poll to create a short story for him.

Shanks was one of the main characters in the One Piece Film: Red which directed by Gorō Taniguchi and produced by Toei Animation.
 
Shanks had also appeared in many One Piece Video Games including One Piece: Grand Battle! Series, One Piece Treasure Cruise, One Piece: Burning Blood, One Piece Thousand Storm, One Piece Bounty Rush, One Piece: Pirate Warriors 4, One Piece: Unlimited World Red, One Piece: Super Grand Battle! X, One Piece: Pirate Warriors 3 and etc.

In One Piece: Pirate Warriors 3, it revealed that Shanks had an abilities that can manipulate time, can generate Red Lightning from his Conqueror's Haki and can use a powerful gun as well. These Shanks abilities had never seen in the manga and anime yet.

Reception

Shanks is one of the most popular character in One Piece series. Despite appearing rarely, Shanks is always in the top fifteen most popular characters and was rated in the top ten most popular characters during the series’ first, second, and fourth popularity poll.
 Additionally, Shanks won a 2008 poll of characters to lead a short story.

In three episode reviews, Chris Beveridge wrote for Fandom Post that it was "mildly interesting" to see how Shanks and Buggy interacted in their youth. They enjoyed especially how this related to the theme of pirate crews as a family within One Piece: "I like the smaller moments where we get Shanks watching over him protectively and then having both Roger and Oden doing the same for both of the boys. It’s a nice cyclical aspect to the kind of “parenting” bond that exists within the pirate families and how we’ve seen similarities from them in later times as well." Shanks' reaction to what the One Piece is "hit a hit a special moment here because of the long association with them" in the series.

Nick Valdez states in review for ComicBook.com that "Shanks is actually one of the most important figures in the series overall when you think about it because he was so instrumental in starting Luffy on his journey to becoming the Pirate King. He's been so instrumental to the core of the series, but we've only seen him a few times throughout the course of the series. He's always been just outside of Luffy's travels, but each time we actually get to see him there's quite a magnanimous presence. It's a fierce presence that carries a significant amount of weight.” In another review Valdez noted the "final confrontation between Luffy and Shanks is one of the most anticipated moments for fans of the series." Valdez also wrote how one of the series’ "major mysteries is Red-Haired Shanks” due to hints of a politically powerful background.

References 

One Piece characters
 Comics characters introduced in 1997
Fictional pirates
Fictional amputees
One Piece characters
Anime and manga characters who can move at superhuman speeds
Anime and manga characters with superhuman strength
Martial artist characters in anime and manga
Comics characters introduced in 1997
Fictional characters with disfigurements
Fictional sea pirates
Fictional kenjutsuka
Fictional swordfighters in anime and manga
Male characters in anime and manga
Vigilante characters in comics